The All-Ireland League (AIL), known for sponsorship reasons as the Energia All-Ireland League, is the national league system for the 50 senior rugby union clubs in Ireland, covering both the Republic of Ireland and Northern Ireland. The league was inaugurated in the 1990–91 season.

The league is the second highest level of rugby union in Ireland, as professional teams representing the four provinces of Ireland play in the United Rugby Championship.

Division 1 sides may field no more than two professional players in their matchday sides, and only one may be a forward. Division 2 sides may not field professional players. Foreign professional players may not play in the League.
Cork Constitution, the inaugural winners , are the only club to have retained top division status since the inception of the league.

Competition format
The league is divided into five divisions of ten teams each. Teams play each other team in the division twice per season (once at home and once away), for a total of 18 regular-season matches. 
The season runs from mid-September until mid-April, with an approximately four-week break in matches from mid-December to early-January. At the end of the season, the top four teams in division 1A enter a play off semi-finals and a final for the championship.

Promotion and relegation
At the end of each season the bottom team in division 1A is replaced by the top team in division 1B, with the second-bottom team entering a promotion/relegation play-off with the second-placed team in 1B. The bottom two teams in 1B, 2A and 2B are relegated and replaced by the top two teams from divisions 2A, 2B and 2C respectively.

The two teams finishing bottom of division 2C are relegated to the relevant provincial league, and replaced by the two teams finishing top of a "round robin" tournament between the four provincial league winners. The four provincial junior leagues are the Connacht Junior League, the Leinster League, the Munster Junior League and the Ulster Championship League.

History
Prior to 1990, there was no national league in Ireland. Each of the four provincial unions had its own cup and league tournament.  In 1991, after almost five years of discussion and consultation with clubs, the All-Ireland League (AIL) was introduced with two divisions, division 1 with 9 clubs and division 2 with 10 clubs. The AIL was expanded to four divisions in 1993–94, with small variations in the numbers of teams per division in subsequent seasons.

In 2000–01 the league was restructured to three divisions, each with 16 teams. After the 1995 introduction of professionalism in rugby union, the IRFU increased the importance of the provinces, which from 2002 participated in the Celtic League (now the Pro14) as full-time teams rather than ad hoc selections of club players. Therefore, the best Irish players no longer played in the AIL. In 2004 the IRFU proposed scrapping the All-Ireland League and reintroducing a provincial league system in 2005–06 which would act as qualifiers for a curtailed three division AIL structure in the second half of the season, but this model did not receive the support of clubs or rugby pundits. In 2007 the IRFU agreed that the structure of the All-Ireland League would remain as three divisions with 16 clubs each for seasons 2008–09 and 2009–10. In 2009–10, division 1 was split into 1A and 1B with eight teams in each as a trial and then continued in season 2010–11. In 2011–12 division 1A and 1B had 10 clubs each and divisions 2 and 3 were reformatted as divisions 2A and 2B with 16 clubs in each division.

Previous winners

1990–91 Cork Constitution†
1991–92 Garryowen
1992–93 Young Munster
1993–94 Garryowen
1994–95 Shannon
1995–96 Shannon
1996–97 Shannon
1997–98 Shannon ‡
1998–99 Cork Constitution (after Extra Time)
1999–2000 St Mary's College
2000–01 Dungannon
2001–02 Shannon
2002–03 Ballymena
2003–04 Shannon
2004–05 Shannon
2005–06 Shannon
2006–07 Garryowen
2007–08 Cork Constitution
2008–09 Shannon (after Extra Time)
2009–10 Cork Constitution (after Extra Time)
2010–11 Old Belvedere
2011–12 St Mary's College
2012–13 Lansdowne
2013–14 Clontarf§
2014–15 Lansdowne
2015–16 Clontarf
2016–17 Cork Constitution
2017–18 Lansdowne
2018–19 Cork Constitution
2019–20 Postponed
2020–21 Postponed
2021–22 Clontarf

† From season 1990–91 through to 1996–97, the team placing top of Division 1 was crowned AIL League Champion
‡ From season 1997–98, playoffs were introduced which was contested by the top four teams in Division 1 for the title of AIL League Champion; in the semi-finals the top placed team played the 4th placed team and the 2nd placed team the 3rd placed team
§ The title in 2013–14 was decided on final league position; there were no play-offs.

Club statistics
The All-Ireland League has been dominated by teams from Limerick (Shannon, Garryowen, and Young Munster) who have won 13 out of 29 titles. Teams from Munster have won 19 out of 29.

Teams 
Divisions for the 2022–23 season.

Division 1A

Division 1B

Division 2A

Division 2B

Division 2C

Sponsorship
The All-Ireland League was not sponsored in the initial season, but was sponsored for six years by Insurance Corporation of Ireland. The League was sponsored by Allied Irish Banks from 1998 to 2010, Ulster Bank from 2010 to 2019, 2018/19 season was not sponsored and Energia since the 2019–20 season.

See also
 All-Ireland Cup
 Pro14

References

External links
 Official results service

 
Rugby union leagues in Ireland
Rugby union leagues in Europe
All-Ireland organisations
Irish senior rugby competitions
Ireland
1990 establishments in Ireland
Sports leagues established in 1990